is a former Japanese football player and manager. He played for Japan national team.

Club career
Saito was born in Saitama on July 27, 1951. After graduating from Hosei University, he joined his local club Mitsubishi Motors in 1974. The club won the 2nd place for 4 years in a row (1974-1977). In 1978, the club won all three major title in Japan; Japan Soccer League, JSL Cup and Emperor's Cup. The club also won 1980 Emperor's Cup, 1981 JSL Cup and 1982 Japan Soccer League. However, in 1988–89 season, the club finished at the bottom place and was relegated Division 2. He retired in 1989. He played 248 games and scored 3 goals in the league. He was selected Best Eleven in 1975, 197 and 1978.

National team career
On January 28, 1976, Saito debuted for Japan national team against Bulgaria. He played as regular player at 1976 Summer Olympics qualification and 1978 World Cup qualification. He was also selected for Japan for 1978 Asian Games. In 1984, he played for Japan for the first time in 6 years. 1984 Summer Olympics qualification was his last game for Japan. He played 32 games for Japan until 1984.

Coaching career
Saito retired from playing career in 1989, he became a manager for Mitsubishi Motors (later Urawa Reds) as Kuniya Daini successor. In 1989–90 season, he led the club to won the champions in Division 2 and promoted to Division 1. He resigned in 1992. Through a coach for Urawa Reds and JEF United Ichihara (later JEF United Chiba), he signed with Kawasaki Frontale in 1997. In 2000, he returned to Urawa Reds and managed the club. From 2010, he signed with JEF United Chiba and became a coach. In 2014, he managed JEF United Chiba as caretaker as Jun Suzuki successor.

Club statistics

National team statistics

Managerial statistics

References

External links
 
 Japan National Football Team Database

1951 births
Living people
Hosei University alumni
Association football people from Saitama Prefecture
Japanese footballers
Japan international footballers
Japan Soccer League players
Urawa Red Diamonds players
Japanese football managers
J2 League managers
Kawasaki Frontale managers
Urawa Red Diamonds managers
JEF United Chiba managers
Footballers at the 1978 Asian Games
Association football defenders
Asian Games competitors for Japan